Anerastia stramineipennis is a species of snout moth in the genus Anerastia. It was described by Strand in 1919. It is found in Taiwan.

References

Moths described in 1919
Anerastiini
Moths of Taiwan